Podvolochnaya is a rural locality (a village) in Verkh-Invenskoye Rural Settlement, Kudymkarsky District, Perm Krai, Russia. The population was 1 as of 2010. There is 1 street.

Geography 
Podvolochnaya is located 3 km south of Kudymkar (the district's administrative centre) by road.

References 

Rural localities in Kudymkarsky District